Chekhov is the name of several inhabited localities in Russia.

Urban localities
 Chekhov, Moscow Oblast, a town in Chekhovsky District of Moscow Oblast

Rural localities
 Chekhov, Bryansk Oblast, a settlement in Dobrodeyevsky Selsoviet of Zlynkovsky District of Bryansk Oblast
 Chekhov, Sakhalin Oblast, a selo in Kholmsky District of Sakhalin Oblast